Christopher Clay Austin (February 24, 1964 – March 16, 1991) was an American country music singer. Austin was signed to Warner Bros. Records in 1988 and charted three singles on the Billboard Hot Country Songs chart. His highest-charting single, "Blues Stay Away from Me," was included on the 1989 compilation album New Tradition Sings the Old Tradition. Austin also co-wrote Ricky Skaggs' 1991 single "Same Ol' Love."

Austin was most known for playing guitar and fiddle for Ricky Skaggs's and Reba McEntire's road bands. Austin toured with McEntire until an airplane carrying Austin, six other members of McEntire's band, and her road manager crashed into a nearby mountain after taking off from an airport in San Diego, California, killing all on board.

Singles

References

1964 births
1991 deaths
American country singer-songwriters
American male singer-songwriters
People from Boone, North Carolina
Warner Records artists
Victims of aviation accidents or incidents in the United States
20th-century American singers
Singer-songwriters from North Carolina
Country musicians from North Carolina
20th-century American male singers
Accidental deaths in California
Musicians killed in aviation accidents or incidents
Victims of aviation accidents or incidents in 1991